Simone Pavan (born 29 April 1974) is an Italian football coach and former player.

Playing career
He spent most of his career with S.S.C. Venezia in both Serie A and Serie B, and has also represented Atalanta B.C., Modena F.C., U.C. Sampdoria, and A.S. Livorno Calcio in the top-flight Serie A championship. He also played three games for the Italy national under-21 football team.

Coaching career
He took over his first head coaching role at Modena, first serving as a caretaker after Walter Novellino's dismissal in March 2015. He then returned into his previous role as youth coach, only to be reappointed in charge of the first team for the 2016–17 season after the club's relegation to Lega Pro.

His first full-time stint as a head coach however turned out to be unsuccessful, and he was removed from managerial duties on 26 November 2016, with Modena deep into relegation zone.

On 3 July 2019 he was appointed head coach of Serie C club Vis Pesaro. On 18 February 2020, he was dismissed by Vis Pesaro after the club only gained 2 points in the previous 5 games, including two 0–4 losses.

References

External links
FIGC profile
EspaceFoot profile
Pavan links up with Livorno, UEFA, August 4, 2006
Il Cavarzere vince a tavolino a sale in vetta, Il Gazzettino, March 4, 2010

1974 births
Living people
People from Latisana
Italian footballers
Atalanta B.C. players
Venezia F.C. players
Modena F.C. players
U.C. Sampdoria players
U.S. Livorno 1915 players
A.S.D. Portogruaro players
Serie A players
Serie B players
Association football central defenders
Italy under-21 international footballers
Italian football managers
Serie C managers
Footballers from Friuli Venezia Giulia